The Aruba national football team  (Dutch: Arubaans voetbalelftal; Papiamento: Seleccion Arubano di futbol) is the national team of Aruba, it was founded in 1932 and is affiliated with the Caribbean Football Union (CFU), CONCACAF and FIFA (since 1988) and is controlled by the Arubaanse Voetbal Bond.

History

Between 1924 and 1933, Aruba only played against Curaçao, although these matches are not considered official. Aruba participated in its first tournament at the 1955 CCCF Championship, where they finished in 5th place. In 1958, Aruba became part of the Netherlands Antilles until their secession in 1986.

Following its split from the Netherlands Antilles, the Aruba Football Federation was affiliated in 1988 with CONCACAF and FIFA. Aruba entered qualifying for the 1989 Caribbean Cup, and in its first group match it suffered the worst defeat in its history, at the hands of Trinidad and Tobago, which crushed them 11–0. They played their first World Cup qualifying match against the Dominican Republic as part of the 1998 World Cup qualifying. Aruba has participated in all the qualifying tournaments for the World Cup since, without being able to get past the first qualifying round.

Aruba has also yet to qualify for the Caribbean Cup. However, they showed some progress in the preliminary round of the 2014 Caribbean Cup by getting two wins against Turks and Caicos (1–0) and British Virgin Islands (7–0), the latter being the biggest victory in its history. These results allowed them to reach 120th place in the FIFA World Ranking for the month of June 2014, their best ranking to date. Following these victories, Aruba lost 2–0 against French Guiana and were eliminated.

Aruba began their 2018 World Cup qualification in the second round against Barbados, losing 2–0 at home and 1–0 away, however FIFA ruled that Barbados had fielded an ineligible player, giving Aruba a 3–0 second leg victory and advancing them to the third round. Despite that, in the next round they were defeated again, this time by Saint Vincent and the Grenadines who won 3–2 on aggregate. Aruba failed to progress in the 2022 World Cup qualifiers, finishing 4th in the first round.

Recent results and forthcoming fixtures
The following is a list of match results in the last 12 months, as well as any future matches that have been scheduled.

2022

2023

Coaching history

 René Notten (1995)
 Ángel Botta (1996)
 Marco Rasmijn (2000)
 Marcelo Muñoz (2004)
 Azing Griever (2004–2006)
 Marcelo Muñoz (2008–2010)
 Epi Albertus (2010–2012)
 Giovanni Franken (2013–2015)
 Rini Coolen (2015)
 Martin Koopman (2015–2020)
 Marvic Bermúdez (2020)
 Stanley Menzo (2021–2022)
 Marvic Bermúdez (2022–)

Players

Current squad
The following players were called up for the 2022–23 CONCACAF Nations League C.

Caps and goals correct as of 26 November 2022, after the match against Bonaire.

Recent call-ups
The following players have been recently called up by the national squad.

Player records

Players in bold are still active with Aruba.

Most appearances

Top goalscorers

Competitive record

FIFA World Cup

CONCACAF Gold Cup

CONCACAF Nations League

CFU Caribbean Cup

ABCS Tournament

*Draws include knockout matches decided on penalty kicks.

Head-to-head record

Note: teams that are in italics indicates that the team is a historical team of a polity not existing anymore, or a team which is not a FIFA member.

As of 6 June 2021

These all-time records are exclusively class 'A' internationals matches.

References

External links
Country profile – FIFA
Country roster – National Football Teams
Team 2008
Netherlands Antilles vs Aruba, Digicel Caribbean Championships 2008, YouTube
Grenada vs Aruba, Digicel Caribbean Championships 2008, YouTube

 
Caribbean national association football teams